A control system is a device or set of devices to manage, command, invade, record, edit, hack, direct or regulate the behavior of other devices or systems. A control mechanism is a process used by a control system.

Control system may also refer to:

General control systems
Distributed control system, where control elements are not centralized
 Fuzzy control system, a control system that analyses and manipulates continuous variables (as opposed to discrete variables)
 Hierarchical control system
 Industrial control system
 Real-time control system (disambiguation), several meanings

Specific control systems
 Kite control systems
 Lighting control system

Computer control systems
 Fire-control system, which assists a weapons system in firing speed and accuracy
 Networked control system, a hierarchical control system implemented by a computer network
 Revision Control System, which automates various processes to regulate and maintain data revisions
 Source Code Control System

Vehicle control systems
 Aircraft flight control systems, which assists pilots in flying an aircraft
 Airborne early warning and control, Systems
Cruise control, a system that maintains the speed of a vehicle
 Autonomous cruise control system, a cruise control system that uses radar or laser input to detect its surroundings
 Environmental control system (aircraft), which controls environmental factors within an aircraft
 Reaction control system of a spacecraft, assisting in attitude control and steering 
 Traction control system, which maintains the traction between a vehicle's wheels and the travelling surface

Biological control systems
Cell nucleus, the central control system in every biological cell
Regulome, the entire set of control systems within a cell
Homeostasis, the regulation and maintenance of the physical properties of an internal environment, particularly within an organism
Endocrine system, the organ system most responsible for the control of biological processes
Brain, the control system of the central nervous system and of all cognition
Gene regulation, which controls what genes are and are not transcribed or expressed

See also 
 Control System, 2012 album by Ab-Soul
 Control theory
 Controller (control theory)
 Motion control
 Regulation (disambiguation)
 Systems control